Maccarone is a contemporary art gallery in the West Village neighborhood of New York City.

History
Founded in 2001 by Michele Maccarone, the gallery opened in an abandoned electronics store at 45 Canal Street. The gallery was among the first to exhibit in Chinatown, and the space allowed for the mounting of several projects historic in scope and unique to the space, including young artists alongside historic figures. For the opening show by Christoph Büchel, visitors had to sign a waiver before crawling through a carved hole in the wall to enter various small rooms, some of which were only four feet high.

In 2007, the gallery moved to the West Village where it inhabits a  space at 630 Greenwich Street. In 2012, Maccarone took over the lease from a space that had been home to a dry cleaner around the corner but in the same building as her gallery at 630 Greenwich Street.

Between 2005 and 2007, Maccarone presented exhibitions at MC, a project space she operated jointly with the dealer Christian Haye in Culver City. On September 19, 2015 – one day before the scheduled debut of The Broad nearby – Maccarone Los Angeles opened at 300 South Mission Road in Boyle Heights, Los Angeles. Located in an industrial building constructed in 1926 and transformed by Jeffrey Allsbrook and Silvia Kuhle of Los Angeles-based firm Standard, the new space has , including a  vacant lot to show outdoor sculpture.

Artists

References

External links
 official site
 "Michele Maccarone" Interviewed by Amy Kellner, 2010
 "Please Do Not Remove this Label" by Nick Stillman, The Brooklyn Rail, July 2005.
 "Art in Review; Mike Bouchet" by Holland Cotter. The New York Times, May 20, 2005.
  "Felix Gmelin: Maccarone Inc." by Margaret Sundell. ArtForum, Sept 2004
 "The New Dealers" by Alex Mar. New York Magazine, December 1, 2003
 "Christian Jankowski at Maccarone, Inc, New York" by Stephanie Cash. Art in America, September 2002.
 https://www.nytimes.com/2007/09/16/arts/design/16robe.html?_r=1&oref=slogin/ "Art in Review: Christoph Büchel"] by Roberta Smith. The New York Times, December 21, 2001.
  The Frieze Art Fair: Amanda Sharp and  Michele Maccarone interviewed by Mark Fletcher of WPS1 

Contemporary art galleries in the United States
Art museums and galleries in Manhattan
Art galleries established in 2001
2001 establishments in New York City